Paderborn is an electoral constituency (German: Wahlkreis) represented in the Bundestag. It elects one member via first-past-the-post voting. Under the current constituency numbering system, it is designated as constituency 137. It is located in eastern North Rhine-Westphalia, comprising the Paderborn district.

Paderborn was created for the inaugural 1949 federal election. Since 2009, it has been represented by Carsten Linnemann of the Christian Democratic Union (CDU).

Geography
Paderborn is located in eastern North Rhine-Westphalia. As of the 2021 federal election, it is coterminous with the Paderborn district.

History
Paderborn was created in 1949, then known as Paderborn – Wiedenbrück. From 1980 through 2009, it was named Paderborn. In 2013 and 2017, it was named Paderborn – Gütersloh III. From the 2021 election, it has again been named Paderborn. In the 1949 election, it was North Rhine-Westphalia constituency 45 in the numbering system. From 1953 through 1961, it was number 104. From 1965 through 1976, it was number 106. From 1980 through 1998, it was number 107. From 2002 through 2009, it was number 138. Since 2013, it has been number 137.

Originally, the constituency comprised the districts of Paderborn and Wiedenbrück. From 1965 through 1976, it comprised the Padern and Wiedenbrück districts without the municipality of Gütersloh. From 1980 through 2002, it was coterminous with the Padern district. In 2013 and 2017, it also contained the municipality of Schloß Holte-Stukenbrock from the Gütersloh district. Ahead of the 2021 election, Schloß Holte-Stukenbrock was transferred away from the constituency, and it has again been coterminous with the Paderborn district.

Members
The constituency has been held continuously by the Christian Democratic Union (CDU) since its creation. It was first represented by Maria Niggemeyer from 1949 to 1957, followed by Rainer Barzel until 1980. Heinrich Pohlmeier then served three terms. Friedhelm Ost was representative from 1990 to 2002, when he was succeeded by Gerhard Wächter, who served until 2009. Carsten Linnemann was elected in 2009, and re-elected in 2013, 2017, and 2021.

Election results

2021 election

2017 election

2013 election

2009 election

References

Federal electoral districts in North Rhine-Westphalia
1949 establishments in West Germany
Constituencies established in 1949
Paderborn (district)